Aglarond may refer to:

 Aglarond, the Glittering Caves of Helm's Deep in Tolkien's Middle-earth legendarium
 Aglarond (Forgotten Realms), a fictional kingdom in the Forgotten Realms campaign setting for the Dungeons and Dragons roleplaying game